Fernando Da Cruz (born 25 October 1972) is a French professional football manager, and former futsal player who represented the France national futsal team. He is managing the Moroccan club AS FAR

Playing career
Da Cruz was an amateur footballer, but was called up to represent the France national futsal team in 1998 at the age of 26, and later became their captain.

Coaching career
Da Cruz began his managerial career as assistant coach with Wasquehal in Belgium, and has stints coaching the youth with Lille OSC and Royal Excel Mouscron. On 29 December 2014, he was named temporary manager of Mouscron after the sacking of Rachid Chihab. On 31 January 2016, Da Cruz left Mouscron to work as a scout with Lille OSC.

Da Cruz became manager of the Lille B team from 2018 to 2020. On 27 July 2020, he was again named manager of Mouscron.

References

External links
Eupen official profile 

FDB profile

1972 births
Living people
People from Villeneuve-d'Ascq
French footballers
French men's futsal players
French football managers
French people of Portuguese descent
Association football midfielders
Lille OSC non-playing staff
Royal Excel Mouscron managers
French expatriate football managers
Expatriate football managers in Belgium
French expatriate sportspeople in Belgium
French expatriate sportspeople in Morocco
Sportspeople from Nord (French department)